Damasio is a surname. Notable persons with that name include:

 Alain Damasio (born 1969), French sci-fi and fantasy writer
 Antonio Damasio (born 1944), Portuguese-American neuroscientist
 Éldis Fernando Damasio (born 1981), Brazilian footballer
 Hanna Damasio, Portuguese-American neuroscientist
 Jairon Feliciano Damasio (born 1981), Brazilian footballer
 Matias Damásio (born 1982), Angolan singer